Chégamat (also written Chegamate) is a village in the commune of Oued El Alenda, in Mih Ouensa District, El Oued Province, Algeria.

References

Neighbouring towns and cities

Populated places in El Oued Province